The magistrate of Penghu is the chief executive of the government of Penghu County. This list includes directly elected magistrates of the county. The incumbent Magistrate is Chen Kuang-fu of the Democratic Progressive Party since 25 December 2022.

Directly elected County Magistrates

Timeline

See also
 Penghu County Government

References

External links 
 Magistrates - Penghu County Government 
 

Penghu